Blum & Poe is a contemporary art gallery located in Los Angeles, New York, and Tokyo.

Development
Blum & Poe was founded by Tim Blum and Jeff Poe in Santa Monica, California, in September 1994.

The inaugural exhibition in Santa Monica featured Stroke, an installation by British artist Anya Gallaccio, consisting of chocolate smeared onto the gallery walls.

In 2003, Blum & Poe relocated to a 5,000-square-foot warehouse on the edge of Culver City, an area of industrial warehouses. Several other galleries subsequently opened on the same stretch of La Cienega Boulevard, resulting in the formation of the Culver City Art District. 

On its 15th anniversary in 2009, the gallery purchased a 22,000-square-foot building across the street on La Cienega Boulevard and renovated it into a series of exhibition spaces on two floors.

Japanese artists
Prior to returning to Los Angeles in 1994, Blum had spent several years living and working in the Tokyo art world. During that time he met Yoshitomo Nara and Takashi Murakami. Blum and Poe visited Murakami's studio in Toyama to see his then newly created Oval Buddha (2007). The massive sculpture was funded through the efforts of the gallerists. Following its opening in Santa Monica, Blum & Poe gave Yoshitomo Nara his first solo exhibition in the United States in 1995. Takashi Murakami’s first solo exhibition with the gallery was in 1997.

In January 2010, Blum & Poe held a solo exhibition of Lee Ufan, the influential Korean artist/theorist of Mono-ha, a loose group of Tokyo-based artists who established themselves in the late 1960s. In February 2012, the gallery held “Requiem for the Sun: The Art of Mono-ha,” the first survey of Mono-ha in the United States, which included major installations by Kōji Enokura, Noriyuki Haraguchi, Susumu Koshimizu, Lee Ufan, Nobuo Sekine, Kishio Suga, Jiro Takamatsu, and Katsurō Yoshida.

In February to May 2019, Blum & Poe Los Angeles hosted the two-part exhibition “Parergon: Japanese Art of the 1980s and 1990s” curated by Mika Yoshitake, which presented the work of over twenty-five visual artists in an array of media spanning painting, sculpture, duration performance, noise, video, and photography. The exhibition title makes reference to the gallery in Tokyo (Gallery Parergon, 1981-1986) that introduced many artists associated with the New Wave phenomenon, its name attributed to Jacques Derrida’s essay from 1979 which questioned the “framework” of art, influential to artists and critics during the period. A catalogue was published alongside the exhibition by Blum & Poe and Skira Editore.

In June 2019, Blum & Poe opened "Vong Co RAHZI", a group exhibition inspired by the influential Japanese visual and music artist  'EYƎ'. It featured a selection of works by EYƎ, known as a pioneer of the Japanese noise genre, and four artists influenced by him. One was Masaho Anotani, who uses his surreal and luminous artworks like a Shaman to communicate what is sacred. There was also Teppei Kaneuji, who re-configures consumer goods for bizarre fantastical sculptures, and the painter of unusual and purposely unrealistic representations of memories, Chihiro Mori. The fourth artist was Tomoo Gokita, who presents cultural archetypes with warped and concealed features in grayscale, monochrome, abstract and figurative paintings and drawings.

In 2021, Blum & Po partnered with ANOMALY Gallery for the Art Collaboration Kyoto Art Fair, which sought to bridge the distance between the Japanese art scene and the art scene overseas. Artists featured were gathered under the theme society and labour. 'We share one artist, Yukinori Yanagi, but we thought the real pleasure would come from collaborating with artists the other gallery has never worked with before.'  the gallery director at ANOMALY tells Ocula Magazine.

Korean artists (Dansaekhwa)
Following the 2010 solo exhibition of Lee Ufan and the subsequent survey of Mono-ha in 2012, Blum & Poe expanded its exploration of the artistic contexts in which Lee Ufan worked. In parallel to his involvement with Mono-ha, Lee had been an influential figure to his peers in Korea, whose works were collectively referred to as Dansaekhwa (monochrome painting).

In September 2014, the gallery held "From All Sides: Tansaekhwa on Abstraction," curated by Joan Kee, Associate Professor of History of Art at the University of Michigan, at Blum & Poe in Los Angeles. Featuring Lee and six other core artists from the movement — Chung Sang-Hwa (Chung Sanghwa), Ha Chonghyun, Kwon Young-woo, Park Seobo and Yun Hyong-keun — "From All Sides" was the first major survey of Dansaekhwa to be held in the United States. Blum & Poe in New York subsequently held Ha Chonghyun's first US solo show in November 2014, and Yun Hyong-keun's first posthumous US solo show in November 2015.

Artists currently represented

 Alma Allen
 Theodora Allen
 Karel Appel
 March Avery
 Darren Bader
 Alvaro Barrington
 Lynda Benglis
 JB Blunk
 Mohamed Bourouissa
 Pia Camil
 Robert Colescott (since 2017)
 Thornton Dial
 Carroll Dunham
 Sam Durant
 Koji Enokura
 Anya Gallaccio
 Aaron Garber-Maikovska
 Tomoo Gokita
 Sonia Gomes (since 2020)
 Françoise Grossen
 Mark Grotjahn
 Ha Chong-hyun
 Kazunori Hamana
 Julian Hoeber
 Lonnie Holley
 Yukie Ishikawa
 Matt Johnson
 Acaye Kerunen
 Susumu Koshimizu
 Friedrich Kunath
 Yukiko Kuroda
 Shio Kusaka
 Kwon Young-woo
 Mimi Lauter
 Lee Ufan
 Tony Lewis (since 2018)
 Linder
 Florian Maier-Aichen
 Victor Man
 Eddie Martinez
 Paul Mogensen
 Dave Muller
 Kazumi Nakamura
 Yoshitomo Nara
 Asuka Anastacia Ogawa
 Kenjirō Okazaki
 Anna Park
 Solange Pessoa
 Harvey Quaytman
 Lauren Quin
 Umar Rashid
 Matt Saunders
 Hugh Scott-Douglas 
 Nobuo Sekine
 Penny Slinger
 Kishio Suga
 Alexander Tovborg
 Yukinori Yanagi (since 2019)
 Yun Hyong-keun
 Zhu Jinshi

Branches
On its 20th anniversary in 2014, Blum & Poe established two new branches. In May, the gallery opened a gallery in a townhouse on the Upper East Side in New York. In September, Blum & Poe opened a space opposite the Meiji Shrine gardens in central Tokyo.

See also
Contemporary art gallery
List of contemporary artists

References

External links
 Blum & Poe

Art museums and galleries in Los Angeles
Contemporary art galleries in the United States
Contemporary art galleries in Japan
Art museums and galleries in New York City
Culver City, California